Radkan Rural District is a rural district (dehestan) in the Central District of Chenaran County, Razavi Khorasan Province, Iran. At the 2006 census, its population was 11,188, in 2,780 families.  The rural district has 30 villages.

References 

Rural Districts of Razavi Khorasan Province
Chenaran County